Three Rooms in Manhattan is a black-and-white 1965 French drama film filmed in New York City.  It is based on the 1946 novel "Trois Chambres à Manhattan" (which has been translated into English as "Three Rooms in Manhattan" and "Three Bedrooms in Manhattan") by Belgian writer Georges Simenon, about a romance between François, a French actor, and Kay, an American woman. The film is Robert De Niro's feature film debut.

Cast
 Annie Girardot as Kay Larsi  
 Maurice Ronet as François Comte  
 O.E. Hasse as Hourvitch  
 Roland Lesaffre as Pierre  
 Gabriele Ferzetti as Comte Larsi  
 Geneviève Page as Yolande Combes  
 Robert Hoffmann as Thierry  
 Margaret Nolan as June  
 Virginia Vee as La chanteuse noire
 Robert De Niro had a small uncredited part as a client at a dinner scene. Richard S. Castellano as appears as an angry American. Abe Vigoda also appears uncredited as a man in an elevator.

References

External links
 
 

1965 films
French black-and-white films
1965 drama films
Films based on Belgian novels
Films based on works by Georges Simenon
1960s French-language films
Films directed by Marcel Carné
Films shot in New York City
1960s French films